"Unforgettable" is a song by Moroccan-American rapper French Montana featuring  Swae Lee of Rae Sremmurd. It was released through Epic Records and Bad Boy Records on April 7, 2017, as one of the lead singles from his second studio album Jungle Rules, along with "No Pressure". Produced by Jaegen, 1Mind, C.P Dubb, the song peaked at number 3 on the US Billboard Hot 100, making it French Montana's first song as a lead artist to reach the top 10 of that chart and Swae Lee's first as a solo artist. The official music video for "Unforgettable" has received over 1.4 billion views on YouTube.

"Unforgettable" has reached the top 10 in 15 countries including Australia, Canada, Denmark, France, Germany, Ireland, Netherlands, New Zealand, Sweden, Switzerland, and the United Kingdom, and the top 20 in Austria, Czech Republic, Hungary, Lebanon, Norway, Scotland, and Spain.

Background
French Montana leaked the song in November 2016 which featured Swae Lee and added Jeremih. The song was later re-mixed and mastered and was released as an official single on April 7, 2017, alongside "No Pressure" featuring Future. The song has been certified Diamond and Multi Platinum in over sixteen countries and Diamond in the US alone by the Recording Industry Association of America.

Composition
"Unforgettable" is a dancehall and hip hop song. According to the sheet music published at musicnotes.com, the song is written in the key of G♯ minor with a tempo of 98 beats per minute.

Music video
The song's accompanying music video premiered on April 13, 2017, on French Montana's Vevo account on YouTube.
The video was shot in Kampala, Uganda. It was directed by French Montana and Spiff TV and includes Ugandan young dance group known as the Triplets Ghetto Kids. , the video has over 1.4 billion views on YouTube.

Remixes and cover versions

A version featuring Swae Lee with an additional  verse by Slim Jxmmi, the other member of Rae Sremmurd, was released on May 26, 2017.

On June 26, 2017, a Spanish version performed by Colombian singer J Balvin was released.

There is also a remix (as well as an acoustic version) featuring American singer Mariah Carey.

Use in media 
The song is featured in an episode of Grown-ish.

The song was performed by 16-year-old Zhavia on the first episode of the Fox series The Four: Battle for Stardom, winning against Elanese, and dethroning her from one of the four seats.

Track listing
Digital download
"Unforgettable" (featuring Swae Lee) – 3:53
"Unforgettable" (featuring Swae Lee) [Clean] – 3:53

J Hus & Jae5 Remix
"Unforgettable" (J Hus & Jae5 Remix) (featuring Swae Lee) – 3:46

Major Lazer Remix
"Unforgettable" (Major Lazer Remix) (featuring Swae Lee) – 3:16

Latin Remix
"Unforgettable" (with J Balvin) (featuring Swae Lee) – 3:34
"Unforgettable" (with J Balvin) (featuring Swae Lee) [Clean] – 3:34

Tiësto & Dzeko's AFTR:HRS Remix 
"Unforgettable" (Tiësto & Dzeko's AFTR:HRS Remix) (featuring Swae Lee) – 3:40

Mariah Carey Remix 
"Unforgettable" (with Mariah Carey) (featuring Swae Lee) – 3:53
"Unforgettable" (with Mariah Carey) (featuring Swae Lee) [Clean] – 3:53
"Unforgettable" (with Mariah Carey) (Acoustic) (featuring Swae Lee) – 4:04
"Unforgettable" (with Mariah Carey) (Acoustic) (featuring Swae Lee) [Clean] – 4:04

Slushii Remix 
"Unforgettable" (Slushii Remix) (featuring Swae Lee) – 3:07
"Unforgettable" (Slushii Remix) (featuring Swae Lee) [Clean] – 3:07

Charts

Weekly charts

Year-end charts

Decade-end charts

Certifications

Release history

References

2017 singles
2017 songs
French Montana songs
Bad Boy Records singles
Songs written by French Montana
Dancehall songs
Songs written by Swae Lee
Swae Lee songs
Mariah Carey songs
Songs written by Mike Will Made It
Song recordings produced by Mike Will Made It